Nayandahalli is a locality in South Bangalore, India. It is located along the Mysore Road (SH-17). It is bordered by Banashankari, Rajarajeshwari Nagar and the Bangalore University campus (Jnanabharati). 

It is a major transport junction in Bangalore, with Nayandahalli Railway Station, Mysore Road Satellite Bus Station, Mysore Road metro station and NICE Road terminal.

References

Neighbourhoods in Bangalore